= Dongfeng East Road Primary School =

School in Guangzhou, China

Coordinates: 23.1347°N 113.288°E

Guangzhou Dongfeng East Road Primary School (Chinese: 广州市东风东路小学), located in the southern Chinese city of Guangzhou (Canton), was founded in 1984.

== History ==
1921–1927, Zhixin Private School
1928, renamed to Zhixin Girls Private High School
1943, renamed to Zhixin Girls Public High School
1953, renamed to No. 1 Girls High School of Guangzhou
1969, renamed No. 55 High School of Guangzhou
During the Cultural Revolution, Zhixin was renamed to "Red Girls School"
1978–present, Guangzhou Zhixin High School
